Freedom Pass is a concessionary travel scheme, which began in 1973, to provide free travel to residents of Greater London, England, who are aged 66 and over (the age of eligibility increased progressively from 60 in 2010 to 66 in 2020) or who have a disability. The scheme is funded by local authorities and coordinated by London Councils. Originally the pass was a paper ticket, but since 2004 it has been encoded on to a contactless smartcard compatible with Oyster card readers.

History
The scheme was created in 1973 by the Greater London Council, although there had been concessionary bus fare schemes in London before that. When the council was abolished in 1986, responsibility for the scheme passed to the London borough councils. The cost of providing the travel concession is negotiated between London Councils and the local transport operator Transport for London. It is funded through a mixture of national grant and council tax. In 2007 there was a dispute between Mayor of London Ken Livingstone and London Councils on the negotiation process, in particular the ability for the Greater London Authority to impose a charge should no agreement be reached.

Eligibility
Freedom Passes have two main versions, an Older Person's Freedom Pass (OPFP) and a Disabled Person's Freedom Pass (DPFP); the former has a blue right hand edge and the latter a yellow one to enable transport operators to quickly identify which concessions are applicable.
Greater London residents who turned 60 before 6 April 2010 were eligible for an OPFP, increasing progressively in line with the women's state pension age to 66 in 2020. London residents over 60 can get a 60+ Oyster card on payment of £20. This has all the benefits of the Freedom Pass within Greater London, but, unlike the Freedom Pass, it is not valid on buses outside Greater London.

Disabled residents for whom an Older Person's Freedom Pass is inappropriate (if they are too young or specifically require a Disabled Person's Freedom Pass) are, if they do not automatically qualify (e.g. if they are already certified as blind), assessed to determine whether their degree of disability allows issue of a disabled person's pass. In early 2010 the responsibility for judging the degree of disability passed to local councils, and there were complaints of people who had been assessed as needing a pass for many years not having their passes renewed although their condition had not improved.

The Freedom Pass webpage links to pages with information on the "national scheme statutory disabled pass" which list the seven main categories of disability set out by the Transport Act 2000 to assess eligibility for a Freedom Pass, and the "London-only discretionary disabled pass"  which may be issued by local councils at their discretion in exceptional circumstances to disabled people who do not meet the criteria.

Those with statutory disabilities entitling them to a DPFP are:
People who are blind or partially sighted
People who are profoundly or severely deaf
People without speech
People who have a disability, or have had an injury, which has left them with a substantial and long-term adverse effect on their ability to walk
People who do not have arms or have a long-term loss of the use of both arms
People who have a learning disability that is defined as 'a state of arrested or incomplete development of mind which includes significant impairment of intelligence and social functioning'
People who, if they applied for the grant of a licence to drive a motor vehicle under Part III of the Road Traffic Act 1988, would have their application refused pursuant to section 92 of the Act (physical fitness) otherwise than on the ground of persistent misuse of drugs or alcohol.

Scope and validity
The Freedom Pass is normally valid at all times on London Underground, London Overground, Elizabeth line, London Buses, Tram, and Docklands Light Railway services in Greater London. Until January 2009 the pass was only valid on weekdays from 9:00; a temporary suspension during the COVID-19 pandemic affecting the UK from 2020 was introduced on 15 June 2020, excluding use of the OPFP and 60+ pass from 4:30 to 9:00.

It is accepted at most times on many rail services in and outside Greater London that are within London fare zones 1–9.

Outside Greater London the card can be used in England (but not Scotland or Wales) wherever and whenever the English National Concessionary Bus Travel Scheme applies, and allows free travel on any local bus route; while some operators may extend validity, travel on working days before 9:30 and after 23:00 is not otherwise included.

Since 2015 OPFPs have been valid for five years, and could be renewed when expired.

Exceptions
Up-to-date information, which changes from time to time, is available on the TfL and the Association of London Councils websites.

On some services the Older Person's Freedom Pass is not valid during the morning rush hour (until 9:00 or 9:30); there are fewer restrictions on the Disabled Person's pass.

The Freedom Pass is not valid for travel on many longer-distance train services even if they stop within Greater London (many such journeys are prohibited for all passengers by "stops for picking up/setting down only" restrictions) or for non-TfL trains to Heathrow airport. They may be used on London Overground trains to Watford Junction in Hertfordshire, but can only be used as far as Harrow and Wealdstone on London Midland and Southern Railway services; Freedom Pass validity for these services is less than that of Oyster cards.

For travel which crosses the boundary of the area of validity of the Freedom Pass at a time and on a service where the Pass is valid, it is normally necessary to buy a ticket only for the section not covered by the Pass, i.e.  a ticket from the Freedom Pass boundary, or from a named station within the zone of validity. In the latter case where multiple operators exist but only one calls at the boundary station, it can sometimes be cheaper to buy a ticket for the cheaper operator from the last station at which their trains call before the boundary rather than the boundary station (e.g. "Thameslink only" from East Croydon rather than "Any Operator" from Coulsdon South).

The Freedom Pass is not valid on long-distance coach services which are not operating a long-term service with a majority of seats not requiring reservation; other restrictions apply on bus or coach services which are not operating as a stage carriage (in summary, a service of any distance using buses or coaches providing local services) or in substitution of a railway service on which the Freedom Pass would be valid. They are not valid for any travel purposes in Scotland, Wales or Northern Ireland.

Lost, stolen, damaged, or faulty pass
A lost, stolen, damaged, or faulty pass can be replaced on application. There is a charge of £12 for loss or damage, not applicable if the pass is stolen and a police crime reference number has been obtained, and refundable if the pass is returned and found on examination to be faulty rather than damaged.

A faulty or damaged Freedom Pass that does not function as a contactless Oyster card remains valid for travel until replaced; it must be presented for manual inspection. The Freedom Pass website warns that the transport operator's staff will inspect the pass closely to confirm validity, and suggests carrying additional proof of identity; a pass whose validity is doubted may not be accepted.

Restoration of free travel at age 60

Since November 2012 Greater London residents aged 60 or over who do not qualify for a Freedom Pass are eligible for a 60+ Oyster card on payment of a £20 administration fee; this restores the entitlement to free (at the time of use) travel from the age of 60 that was removed when the general qualifying age for concessionary travel was tied by national legislation to the national retirement age in 2010. The 60+ Oyster card is valid on the same services within Greater London and some adjacent places as the Freedom Pass but is not valid for travel elsewhere in England.

In 2022, Prime Minister Boris Johnson falsely claimed to have introduced the Freedom Pass during an interview where he was questioned about a pensioner having to ride the bus all day to save on heating costs during the 2021–2022 global energy crisis. As Mayor of London, he was responsible for the 2012 changes, but the pass itself predates his term by several decades. It was also pointed out that one of the conditions of his government's TFL bailout during the COVID-19 pandemic involved new restrictions imposed on the use of the Freedom Pass.

See also
 English National Concessionary Travel Scheme

References

Fare collection systems in London
Old age in the United Kingdom